İbrahim Türkkan (born 11 May 1983 in West Berlin, West Germany) is a Turkish footballer.

Career 
After starting his career as a youth footballer at Tennis Borussia Berlin, Türkkan moved to fellow Berlin club BFC Südring before transferring to Hertha BSC II in 2002. Another spell at TeBe was sandwiched between appearances at SV Yeşilyurt. In the 2006–07 season, Türkkan scored 19 goals for Berlin AK 07, making him the division's top scorer. Türkkan spent the opening months of the 2007–08 season at SV Babelsberg 03 in Potsdam, making 10 appearances, nine in the then-Tier III Regionalliga Nord (scoring one goal) and one in the 2007–08 DFB-Pokal first round loss to MSV Duisburg. He left Babelsberg in the new year on mutual terms. He then spent one year in his native Turkey at Göztepe S.K. before moving back to Berlin where he played one more season for AK 07 before going back to his youth club Tennis Borussia for the 2010–11 NOFV-Oberliga Nord season. He was, however, released from his contract during the winter break.

References

External links 
 

1983 births
Living people
Footballers from Berlin
German people of Turkish descent
Turkish footballers
Association football forwards
Tennis Borussia Berlin players
Hertha BSC II players
SV Yeşilyurt players
Berliner AK 07 players
SV Babelsberg 03 players
Göztepe S.K. footballers